Daan Blij (born 25 September 1993) is a Dutch professional footballer who currently plays as a winger.

Club career
He played professionally for Excelsior, but moved to amateur side Excelsior Maassluis in summer 2015.

References

1993 births
Living people
Footballers from Rotterdam
Association football wingers
Dutch footballers
Excelsior Rotterdam players
Excelsior Maassluis players
Eredivisie players
Eerste Divisie players
Tweede Divisie players
Derde Divisie players